The 2013 Rhode Island Rams football team represented the University of Rhode Island in the 2013 NCAA Division I FCS football season. They were led by fifth year head coach Joe Trainer and played their home games at Meade Stadium. They were a member of the Colonial Athletic Association. They finished the season 3–9, 2–6 in CAA play.

The Rams entered the season having lost a school-record 13 straight contests dating back to the final two games of the 2011 season. That record was extended to 15 after losing their opening two games of 2013 before finally ending the losing streak with a win over Albany on September 14.

Schedule

References

Rhode Island
Rhode Island Rams football seasons
Rhode Island Rams football